André Lemaire (born 1942) is a French epigrapher, historian and philologist. He is Director of Studies at the École pratique des hautes études, where he teaches Hebraic and Aramean philology and epigraphy. He specializes in West-Semitic old civilization and the origins of monotheism. He is a corresponding member of the Académie des Inscriptions et Belles-Lettres.

He heads the scientific edition of the international series Supplements to Vetus Testamentum (more than 30 volumes).

King Solomon's Temple 
In the 1980s, Lemaire authenticated a small, broken, carved piece of "ivory pomegranate" that dates to the 8th century and would have belonged to the cult objects of Solomon's Temple. This is according to his analysis of the inscription examined with the methods of epigraphy. 

This interpretation was challenged by Yuval Goren of Tel Aviv University, who stated that the inscription is subsequent to damage that had fragmented the piece. 

Following this, a commission of experts from the Israel Museum examined the artifact and concluded that the inscription is a modern forgery, and that the item dates back to the 14th or the 13th century BCE, well before the time of Solomon.

Publications 
1971: Les Ministères aux origines de l'Église : Naissance de la triple hiérarchie, évêques, presbytes, diacres, Éditions du Cerf
1974: Les Ministères dans l'Église, Éditions du Centurion
1994: La Palestine à l'époque perse (with Ernest-Marie Laperrousaz), Éditions du Cerf
1999: Le Monde de la Bible, Les Arènes
2001: Histoire du peuple hébreu, Que sais-je?, 6th ed.
2001: Prophètes et rois : Bible et Proche-Orient (dir.), Éditions du Cerf
2002: Le Proche-Orient asiatique, volume 2 (with Paul Garelli), PUF
2003: La Naissance du monothéisme : Point de vue d'un historien, Bayard presse

See also 
 James Ossuary
 Abrahamic religions
 Yahweh
 Tel Dan Stele
 James, brother of Jesus

References

External links 
 André Lemaire, « Les Cananéens, le Levant et la mer » Clio

French Hebraists
French orientalists
French philologists
French epigraphers
Academic staff of the École pratique des hautes études
Corresponding members of the Académie des Inscriptions et Belles-Lettres
1942 births
Living people